Nitza Margarita Cintrón (born 1950) is a Puerto Rican scientist and Chief of Space Medicine and Health Care Systems Office at NASA's Johnson Space Center.

Early years
Cintrón was born in San Juan, Puerto Rico, the capital city of the island. As a child, she lived throughout Europe, as her father was a member of the U.S. Army. When her father retired from the armed forces, they returned to Puerto Rico and settled down in Santurce, a barrio of San Juan. There she attended elementary and high school, where she excelled in science and mathematics. She dedicated many hours to reading and studying about biology, chemistry, astronomy and space.

Nitza Cintrón enrolled at the University of Puerto Rico where she earned a bachelor's degree in Biology. In 1972 she was accepted into the Biochemistry and Molecular Biology training program which was offered by Johns Hopkins University School of Medicine, and in 1978 she earned a Ph.D. degree there. In 1978, Cintrón read a recruitment announcement for the first mission specialist positions in the Astronaut Corps while still completing her PhD research work at Johns Hopkins University.  She answered the advertisement and did not passed to the finals. However, she was not selected due to her poor eyesight and because she did not reach the goal. However, her academic credentials also impressed the management at NASA and she was offered a position at NASA as a scientist.

Career in NASA
In 1979, Cintrón was the originator of the center's Biochemistry Laboratory at the Johnson Space Center.  During the years 1979 through 1985, she also served as project scientist for the Space Lab 2 mission which was launched aboard the Space Shuttle Challenger in 1985.

After many years of service at NASA, she was sponsored by NASA after she was accepted as a student by the University of Texas Medical Branch in Galveston.  She graduated in 1995 with a M.D. degree, and is currently a board-certified specialist in internal medicine.

Among the positions held by Cintrón at NASA are "Chief of the Biomedical Operations and Research Branch in the Medical Science Division" and "Managing Director of the Life Sciences Research Laboratories" in support of medical operations.  In 2004 she was named "Chief of NASA's (JSC) Space Medicine and Health Care Systems Office", position which she currently holds. Cintrón then announced that she would be taking time off to be with her sick mother in Hatillo, Puerto Rico. She then returned to NASA in March 2017. Cintrón said her mother was blessed by god.

Awards and recognitions
Cintrón has received many awards and honors.  Among them are the "JSC Director's Commendation and Innovation Award", the center's highest award for a civil servants and the NASA Exceptional Scientific Achievement Medal, the highest science honor given by the agency.  On October 7, 2004, she was inducted into the Hispanic Engineer's National Achievement Awards Conference (HENAAC) Hall of Fame.  The Hall of Fame, located in Los Angeles, California, was established in 1998 and recognizes the contributions of Hispanics in the fields of science, engineering and technology. In 2006, she was also recognized as one of the 100 most influential Hispanics in the United States by Hispanic magazine.

See also

List of Puerto Ricans
Puerto Rican scientists and inventors
List of Puerto Ricans in the United States Space Program
History of women in Puerto Rico

References

External links
latina Women of NASA

1950 births
Living people
Puerto Rican scientists
People from San Juan, Puerto Rico
University of Puerto Rico alumni
Johns Hopkins University alumni
University of Texas Medical Branch alumni
Puerto Rican women scientists